Dees Town is an unincorporated community in Wayne County, in the U.S. state of Missouri.

The community has the last name of Davy, Elijah, and Henry Dees, pioneer citizens.

References

Unincorporated communities in Wayne County, Missouri
Unincorporated communities in Missouri